This is the discography for Canadian jazz musician Paul Bley.

As leader/co-leader

As sideman 
With Don Ellis
 Out of Nowhere (Candid, 1988) – rec. 1961
 Essence (Pacific Jazz, 1962)

With Jimmy Giuffre and Steve Swallow
 1961: The Jimmy Giuffre 3 – Fusion (Verve)
 1961: The Jimmy Giuffre 3 – Thesis (Verve); re-released by ECM together with Fusion, 1992
 1961: Jimmy Giuffre Trio Live in Europe 1961 (Raretone, 1984)
 1961: Emphasis, Stuttgart 1961 (hatART, 1993)
 1961: Flight, Bremen 1961 (hatART, 1993)
 1962: Free Fall (Columbia)
 1989: The Life of a Trio: Saturday (Owl)
 1989: The Life of a Trio: Sunday (Owl)
 1992: Fly Away Little Bird (Owl)
 1993: Conversations with a Goose (Soul Note, 1996)

With Sonny Rollins
 Sonny Meets Hawk! (RCA Victor, 1963)
 Tokyo 1963 (Rare Live Recordings, 1963)

With others
 Jakob Bro, Bro/Knak (Loveland, 2011)[2CD]
 Marion Brown, Sweet Earth Flying (Impulse!, 1974)
 Satoko Fujii, Something About Water (Libra, 1996)
 Charlie Haden, The Montreal Tapes: with Paul Bley and Paul Motian (Verve, 1994) – rec. 1989
 Lee Konitz, Out of Nowhere (SteepleChase, 1997)
 Charlie Parker, Montreal 1953 (Uptown UPCD 27.36, 1993) – rec. 1953
 Mario Pavone, Trio Arc (Playscape, 2008) – rec. 2007
 John Surman, Adventure Playground (ECM, 1992) – rec. 1991
 Andreas Willers, In the North (Between the Lines, 2001)

References 

Discographies of American artists
Jazz discographies